Peter Charles Gaillard was the thirty-eighth mayor of Charleston, South Carolina, serving in 1865-1868. He was the last mayor elected before the Civil War.

He died on January 11, 1889, and is buried at Magnolia Cemetery.

References

Confederate States Army officers
Mayors of Charleston, South Carolina
1812 births
1889 deaths
19th-century American politicians
United States Army officers
United States Military Academy alumni
People from Berkeley County, South Carolina